Wagoner Inlet is an ice-filled inlet between Tinglof Peninsula and Starr Peninsula on the north side of Thurston Island. It was delineated from aerial photos taken by U.S. Navy Operation Highjump in December 1946. It was named by the Advisory Committee on Antarctic Names  for Charles Wagoner, seaman on the USS Glacier during the U.S. Navy Bellingshausen Sea Expedition, a member of the field party engaged in scientific work on Thurston Island in February 1960.

Maps
 Thurston Island – Jones Mountains. 1:500000 Antarctica Sketch Map. US Geological Survey, 1967.
 Antarctic Digital Database (ADD). Scale 1:250000 topographic map of Antarctica. Scientific Committee on Antarctic Research (SCAR), 1993–2016.

References

 

Inlets of Ellsworth Land